Petit Bois Island is a barrier island off the Mississippi Gulf Coast, south of Pascagoula, and one of the Mississippi–Alabama barrier islands. It is part of Jackson County, Mississippi. Since 1971 it has been a part of Gulf Islands National Seashore, administered by the U.S. National Park Service.

According to the United States Geological Survey, variant names are l'Isle de Petit Bois (French, modern spelling would be ) and Petitbois Island.  in French means "little woods". The island was so named by the early French explorers due to a small wooded section located on the eastern end of this mostly sand and scrub-covered island. Following the island's inundation during Hurricane Katrina, most of the trees comprising the little woods section have died.

Shape changes
A French exploration map of 1732 showed an elongated barrier spit between Petit Bois Island and Dauphin Island
This connection was breached between 1740 and 1766, possibly as the result of the 1740 hurricane.

Massacre Island
Early maps suggest that the Petit Bois – rather than current Dauphin Island – may have been the location where a large pile of human skeletons was discovered in 1699, leading to the name Massacre Island.

See also

Mississippi Sound

References

GEMS – Petit Bois Island. Retrieved on 2009-1-28.

External links 

Barrier islands of Mississippi
Protected areas of Jackson County, Mississippi
Gulf Islands National Seashore
Landforms of Jackson County, Mississippi